McSweeney Point is a sharp rock point  east of the terminus of Davidson Glacier, overlooking the Ross Ice Shelf, Antarctica. It was mapped by the United States Geological Survey from tellurometer surveys (1961–62) and Navy air photos (1960), and was named by the Advisory Committee on Antarctic Names for Lieutenant R.H. McSweeney, U.S. Navy, Commanding Officer of the  during Operation Deep Freeze 1963.

References

Headlands of the Ross Dependency
Shackleton Coast